Aakasha Gopuram ( Castle in the Air) is a 2008 Indian Malayalam-language drama film written and directed by K. P. Kumaran. It is a cinematic adaptation of Norwegian writer Henrik Ibsen's 1892 play The Master Builder.

The film stars Mohanlal, Nithya Menen, Bharath Gopi, Manoj K. Jayan, Sreenivasan, Geetu Mohandas, and Shwetha Menon. Santosh Thundiyil handled the cinematography of the film, while British composer John Altman composed the music. Lyrics was written by Rajeev Alunkal.

The film received positive response from critics and was also the official Malayalam and acting debut for actress Nithya Menen. Music was praised by the audience.

Plot
Akasha Gopuram is set among the Indian immigrant community in London and tells the story of Albert Samson, a middle-aged architect who has  clawed his way to prominence.

His single-minded focus on his job, however, has hardened him and prevented him and his wife Alice from having a meaningful family life. The costs of Samson's ambition are also symbolized in his assistant, Abraham Thomas, Samson's own former employer whom he treated badly to reach the top. Thomas, now dying, wants his son Alex to have more independence in the firm. Samson, however, fears that he will be eclipsed by a younger generation of architects, and refuses to allow Alex either to design original houses or to leave the firm and strike out on his own.

Into this tense situation, enter Hilda Varghese, a vivacious young woman who idolized Samson ten years ago when, in the early stages of his career, he built a large church in her hometown and climbed to the top of its tower during its dedication ceremony.  At that time Samson had promised "a kingdom" to Hilda, then a girl of twelve; now, Hilda who earnestly believes his word has come to collect her kingdom.

As Samson struggles with the destructive consequences of his pursuit of glory and his growing fear that he has lost his creative powers, the mysterious Hilda helps him gain a glimpse of his former self.

Cast
 Mohanlal as Albert Samson
 Nithya Menen as Hilda Varghese
 Shweta Menon as Alice
 Bharat Gopy as Abraham
 Sreenivasan as Dr. Isaac
 Manoj K. Jayan as Alex
 Geetu Mohandas as Catherine

Casting 
About her casting in the film Nithya Menon, in an interview with Rediff said, "It happened very strangely and was almost like destiny. I was in the middle of my 12th exams when I had appeared on the cover of a tourism book. Mohanlal saw the picture and I got a call from the film's director. He talked to me and I was selected for the role. Everything happened very quickly."

Release
It had a premiere in Kochi. It was selected for the Indian Panorama section at the International Film Festival of India.

References

External links
 Official website
 

2008 films
2000s Malayalam-language films
Films based on works by Henrik Ibsen
Films set in London
2008 drama films